Jason Elliott (born 11 October 1975), is a Canadian former professional ice hockey player.

Playing career
Born in Inuvik, Northwest Territories, Elliott was drafted 205th overall in the eighth round of 1994 NHL Entry Draft by the Detroit Red Wings, from Cornell University of the National Collegiate Athletic Association. Elliott also played junior ice hockey with the Kimberley Dynamiters of the Rocky Mountain Junior Hockey League and earlier with the Canberra Knights of the Australian Ice Hockey League/East Coast Super League. In the early 1990s he moved to Australia with his parents and played on the Australian national team. He played most of his professional career in the minors but did appear in preseason games in 2002 for Detroit in the National Hockey League, and appeared as third string goalie in the Red Wing's 2002 Stanley Cup victory.  He is included in the team photograph and was awarded a Stanley Cup ring, but never played a game in the NHL.
 Elliott went on to a long minor league career in both the USA and Europe before retiring following the 2006–2007 season.

Awards and honors

References

Notes

1975 births
Adirondack Red Wings players
SC Bietigheim-Bissingen players
Canadian ice hockey goaltenders
Cincinnati Mighty Ducks players
Cornell Big Red men's ice hockey players
Detroit Red Wings draft picks
Houston Aeros (1994–2013) players
Manitoba Moose (IHL) players
Ice hockey people from the Northwest Territories
Living people
People from Inuvik
Rote Teufel Bad Nauheim players
HC TPS players
Canadian expatriates in Australia
Australian ice hockey goaltenders
Naturalised citizens of Australia
Canadian expatriate ice hockey players in the United States
Canadian expatriate ice hockey players in Germany
Canadian expatriate ice hockey players in Finland